Minsheng (Mandarin: 民胜乡) is a township in Xichang, Liangshan Yi Autonomous Prefecture, Sichuan, China. In 2010, Minsheng Township had a total population of 9,905: 5,144 males and 4,761 females: 3,564 aged under 14, 5,833 aged between 15 and 65 and 508 aged over 65.

References 
 

 

 
Township-level divisions of Sichuan
Xichang